Masaichi (written: 雅一, 正一, 政一 or 政市) is a masculine Japanese given name. Notable people with the name include:

, Japanese physician and pathologist
, Japanese baseball player
, Japanese World War II flying ace
, Japanese film producer and baseball executive
, Imperial Japanese Navy admiral

Japanese masculine given names